
Gmina Gródek nad Dunajcem is a rural gmina (administrative district) in Nowy Sącz County, Lesser Poland Voivodeship, in southern Poland.

The gmina contains part of the protected area called Ciężkowice-Rożnów Landscape Park.

Villages
Gmina Gródek nad Dunajcem contains the villages and settlements of Bartkowa, Bujne, Gródek nad Dunajcem, Jelna, Jelna-Działy, Lipie, Podole-Górowa, Przydonica, Przydonica-Glinik, Rożnów, Roztoka, Sienna, Tropie and Zbyszyce.

Neighbouring gminas
Gmina Gródek nad Dunajcem is bordered by the gminas of Chełmiec, Czchów, Korzenna, Łososina Dolna and Zakliczyn.

References
Polish official population figures 2006

Grodek nad Dunajcem
Nowy Sącz County